Castle Tioram (meaning "dry castle") is a ruined castle that sits on the tidal island Eilean Tioram in Loch Moidart, Lochaber, Highland, Scotland. Though hidden from the sea, the castle controls access to Loch Shiel. It is also known to the locals as "Dorlin Castle". The castle is a scheduled monument.

History
Castle Tioram was one of Somerled's castles in his time (the twelfth century), though some may date it from the thirteenth or fourteenth century. It appears to have originally been a principal stronghold of Clann Ruaidhrí. Eilean Tioram, the island the fortress sits upon, is first recorded in a charter of Cairistíona Nic Ruaidhrí, daughter of Ailéan mac Ruaidhrí. According to early modern tradition, preserved by the seventeenth-century Sleat History, the castle was erected by Ailéan's granddaughter, Áine Nic Ruaidhrí. The castle certainly served as the seat of the latter's Clann Raghnaill descendants for centuries.

As such, Castle Tioram is the traditional seat of the Clanranald (Clann Raghnaill) branch of Clan Donald. The castle was seized by Government forces in around 1692 when the clan chief Allan Macdonald of Clanranald joined the Jacobite Court in France, despite having sworn allegiance to William II & Mary II. A small garrison was stationed in the castle until the Jacobite rising of 1715 when Allan recaptured and torched it, purportedly to keep it out of the hands of Hanoverian forces. It has been unoccupied since that time, although there are some accounts suggesting it was partially inhabited thereafter including for the storage of firearms from the De Tuillay in the 1745 Jacobite Uprising and Lady Grange's account of her kidnapping.

Restoration proposals
The castle is now in extremely poor condition and in 1998 was closed to the public at the insistence of the present owner despite the objections of the Highland Council's archaeologist; the walls were in surprisingly good condition, requiring only minor repairs.  However, a major structural collapse occurred at the northwest curtain wall in 2000.  

Proposals to restore the castle by the new owners, Anta Estates, were announced in 1997 and received planning consent from Highland Council. This included the creation of a clan centre/museum, domestic apartments, and some public access. However, Historic Scotland refused Scheduled Monument Consent, a decision upheld after a local public inquiry.

The Royal Commission on the Ancient and Historical Monuments of Scotland, now part of Historic Environment Scotland, holds a substantial archive of research information, drawings, and photographs lodged by the current owners.

Eilean Tioram
The castle can be reached on foot across the tidal causeway, but there is no access to the interior because of the risk of falling masonry. Eilean Tioram is one of 17 tidal islands that can be walked to from the Scottish mainland.

In popular culture
The castle can be seen in an opening aerial montage of the Highlander: The Series fourth season episode, "Homeland."

See also

List of islands of Scotland
Castles in Scotland
Medieval fortification

Notes

References

External links

 Panorama of Castle Tioram 
Photographs and Information from Strolling Guides
Moidart Local History Group
Caisteal Tioram Trust
Castle Tioram - Cur Doirlinn, Moidart, Highland Historic Environment Record

Ruined castles in Highland (council area)
Lochaber
Scheduled Ancient Monuments in Highland
Archaeological sites in Highland (council area)
Public inquiries in Scotland